MTV Rocks may refer to:

MTV Rocks (European TV channel)
MTV Rocks (British and Irish TV channel)